GAFB may be:

George Air Force Base, in Victorville, California
Glasgow Air Force Base, in Glasgow, Montana
Goodfellow Air Force Base, in San Angelo, Texas
Griffiss Air Force Base, formerly in Rome, New York 
Grissom Air Force Base, in Bunker Hill, Indiana
German Armed Forces Badge for Military Proficiency
Google Apps for Business